Neil Cushley (born 23 February 1967) is a British former pair skater. Competing with his sister, Lisa Cushley, he finished 13th at the 1988 Winter Olympics in Calgary. The pair placed 7th at the 1987 European Championships, 14th at the 1988 World championships, and 7th at the 1989 European Championships.

Competitive highlights 
(with Lisa Cushley)

References

British male pair skaters
English male pair skaters
1967 births
Olympic figure skaters of Great Britain
Figure skaters at the 1988 Winter Olympics
Living people
Sportspeople from Middlesbrough